Dichodontium pellucidum is a species of moss belonging to the family Dicranaceae.

It has cosmopolitan distribution.

References

Dicranales